Smile×Smile (released on July 24, 2003) is J-pop artist Mayumi Iizuka's seventh album and was produced by Tore Johansson, who is a Swedish musician.

Exposition 
This, Mayumi Iizuka's seventh album, was produced by Tore Johansson and has ten songs. All of the songs were written the lyrics solely by Iizuka and containing two previously released singles, i.e. "Pure" (#5) and "Kikasete yo Kimi no Koe" (#10). A few songs were composed or arranged by three Swedish musicians, including Johansson.

Also, the sleeve is in a handwritten style by Iizuka in Japanese.

Track listing 
 Kimi to Ita Memory (君といたmemory / Memory with You)
 Lyrics: Mayumi Iizuka
 Composition: cota
 Arrangement: Michiaki Kato
 My Best Friend
 Lyrics: Mayumi Iizuka
 Composition and arrangement: Motoki Matsuoka
 Drive Shiyou yo! (ドライブしようよ! / Let's Drive!)
 Lyrics: Mayumi Iizuka
 Composition: Sora Izumikawa
 Arrangement: Tore Johansson
 Gomen ne (ごめんね / I'm sorry)
 Lyrics: Mayumi Iizuka
 Composition: Ritsuko Okazaki
 Arrangement: Tore Johansson
 Pure
 Lyrics: Mayumi Iizuka
 Composition and arrangement: Tore Johansson and Solveig Sandnes
 Uniform (ユニフォーム)
 Lyrics: Mayumi Iizuka
 Composition and arrangement: Wisao Yoshida
 Party Time (パーティー☆タイム)
 Lyrics: Mayumi Iizuka
 Composition: Ulf Turesson
 Arrangement: Tore Johansson
 Gyutto. (ぎゅっと。/ Tightly.)
 Lyrics: Mayumi Iizuka
 Composition: Kohei Dojima
 Arrangement: Ulf Turesson
 Dream
 Lyrics: Mayumi Iizuka
 Composition and arrangement: Tomoki Hasegawa
 Kikasete yo Kimi no Koe (聴かせてよ君の声 / Give Me the Sound of Your Voice) S×S version
 Lyrics: Mayumi Iizuka
 Composition: Tomoki Hasegawa
 Arrangement: Tomofumi "Chibun" Suzuki

2003 albums
Albums produced by Tore Johansson
Mayumi Iizuka albums